The Portuguese Catholic Diocese of Setúbal has existed since 1975. It is a suffragan of the archdiocese of Lisbon. Its see at Setúbal is south of Lisbon.

See also
 History of Setúbal
 Timeline of Setúbal

Notes

External links
 Official page

Setubal
Setubal, Roman Catholic Diocese of